Zhang Peng (born 9 October 1996) is a Chinese cross-country mountain biker. He competed in the 2020 Summer Olympics.

References

1996 births
Living people
Cyclists at the 2020 Summer Olympics
Chinese male cyclists
Olympic cyclists of China